is a Japanese light novel series written by Hirotsugu Ryusen and illustrated by Fuzichoco. It began serialization as a web novel published on the user-generated novel publishing website Shōsetsuka ni Narō in April 2012. Micro Magazine later acquired the series, which began releasing it in print in June 2014 under their GC Novels imprint. Seventeen volumes have been published as of April 2022. A manga adaptation by Dicca Suemitsu began serialization online via Micro Magazine's Comic Ride website in July 2016, which has been compiled into ten tankōbon volumes as of October 2022. Both the light novel and manga have been licensed in North America by Seven Seas Entertainment. An anime television series adaptation by Studio A-Cat aired from January to March 2022.

Synopsis
The series follows Sakimori Kagami, who has been playing the online video game Arch Earth Online for a long time as the character Dunblf, an old male sorcerer who is one of the game's nine great sages. One day after adjusting his character, he is sucked into the game world, and finds himself inhabiting his character's body, who after his adjustments looks like a young woman; he tries to convince the people of the game world that he is Dunblf's pupil while figuring out on how to turn himself back to normal and escape the game world.

Characters
 /  / 

A 27-year-old male Japanese VRMMO player who, after using a strange cash item called Vanity Case from the game, finds himself translocated into the setting of his role-plays, Ark Earth Online, and transformed not into his favorite character, the powerful magician Dunblf Gandagore (ダンブルフ・ガンダロール; an obvious mingling of the names Gandalf and Dumbledore), but a cute, petite girl with silver hair and blue eyes, though he retains Danblf's sorcerous abilities. In order to explain her abilities, she passes herself off as a pupil of Danblf, who is considered an honored hero. As her new identity, she adopts the name Mira (after the English translation of her own name "Kagami", which means "mirror"). She later reveals her real identity to her companions.

A Holy Knight and King of the Arkite Kingdom. He had the feeling that Mira is in fact Danblf since their first meeting. He also has an interest in militaries.

A Wiseman - or rather, Wisewoman - of the Tower of Elementary Magic, she is a surprisingly young and beautiful red-haired woman with a happy-to-go personality. Luminaria is actually another male Ark Earth roleplayer who found himself displaced into the game's world in female form.

An elf swordsman and one of Cyril's companions.

A fairy and Danblf's personal assistant. She becomes very fond of Mira.

Media

Light novels

Manga

Anime
An anime television series adaptation was announced on May 27, 2020. The series is animated by Studio A-Cat and directed by Keitaro Motonaga, with Takamitsu Kōno overseeing the series' scripts,  Kumi Horii designing the characters, and Go Sakabe composing the series' music. It was initially scheduled to premiere in 2021, but it was later delayed. It aired from January 12 to March 30, 2022, on Tokyo MX and other networks. Funimation co-produced the series. The opening theme song is "Ready Set Go!!" by Asaka, while the ending theme song is "Ambitious" by Erabareshi. Muse Communication licensed the anime in South and Southeast Asia, and the series is available to watch on iQiyi.

Episode list

Notes

References

External links
  at Shōsetsuka ni Narō 
  
  
  
 
 
 

2014 Japanese novels
2022 anime television series debuts
Anime and manga based on light novels
Funimation
Isekai anime and manga
Isekai novels and light novels
Japanese webcomics
Light novels
Light novels first published online
Muse Communication
Seinen manga
Seven Seas Entertainment titles
Shōsetsuka ni Narō
Studio A-Cat
Webcomics in print